Lee Mack's All Star Cast is a Saturday night television programme by the BBC. Each week, host Lee Mack is joined by two celebrity guests and a live studio audience who are entertained by stand-up comedians, random sketches and various games.

Entertainment 
The forty-minute-long show mostly involves host Mack talking to his two or more celebrity guests from behind his desk. He always opens the show with a short monologue, poking fun at news headlines from the past week.

Face Game 
Mack continues the show with an audience competition, giving them an emotion or feeling to portray. The cameras then pick out three or four people with particularly funny faces, who tell Lee Mack and the rest of the audience a story which relates to their portrayal.

Stand Up 
A stand up comedian takes to the stage and entertains the audience for 4–5 minutes.

You Got the Look 
A part of the show where members of the audience who think they are a lookalike of a celebrity will be interviewed by the celebrity panel. They are compared to that celebrity and the winner is later shown in an advertisement for the next week's show. This game only lasted for the first three episodes of the series which was later replaced with an exchange between members of the audience and the celebrity guests, with the audience offering an item to them.

The Sketch 
This part of the show features Mack and the celebrity guests dress up in strange costumes to entertain the audience. Other celebrities that were not previously involved in the show now appear to 'act' alongside Lee.

When Will I be Famous? (for 15 seconds) 
Three or four viewers at home will be shown via Skype to perform an act. They have fifteen seconds to perform, and the winner gets small crown with the number 15 on top. After all the acts have performed and been interviewed by Lee Mack.

Musical performance 
To end the show, a musical act will take to the stage and perform a song to promote sales.

Episodes

Promotions
Each week, adverts are shown in between other BBC One programmes, they feature a member of the studio audience who won the 'You Got the Look' game on the previous week's show.

References

External links

BBC television comedy
2010s British comedy television series
2011 British television series debuts
2011 British television series endings